The Canon of Eclipses (German Canon der Finsternisse), published in 1887 at the Imperial Academy of Sciences of Vienna by Theodor Ritter von Oppolzer, is a compilation of over 13000 (8000 solar and 5200 lunar) eclipses, including all solar and all umbral lunar eclipses between the years 1207 BC and 2161 CE. It was republished by Dover Books in 1962.

References

External links 
 1887 Original German edition at Internet Archive

1887 non-fiction books
Astronomy books
German non-fiction books